The Capture of Wytschaete was a tactical incident in the Battle of Messines (7–14 June 1917)  on the Western Front during the First World War. On 7 June, the ridge was attacked by the British Second Army; the 36th (Ulster) Division and the 16th (Irish) Division of IX Corps captured the fortified village of Wytschaete on the plateau of Messines Ridge, which had been held by the German 4th Army since the First Battle of Ypres (19 October – 22 November 1914).

In April 1917, the senior German commanders in Flanders were willing to contemplate a retirement from the Messines salient but the local  (corps) and divisional commanders objected. The convex slope of the eastern side of the ridge would obstruct artillery observation and the proximity of the Ypres–Comines Canal and the river Lys would hamper the assembly of reserves. The Germans had spent two years fortifying the defences and the local commanders had been assured that British mining attempts had been defeated.

The British attack at Messines was set for 7 June and the plan included the detonation of deep mines that had been laid under the German front position since 1915. IX Corps was due to attack the apex of the German salient and advance , to capture the fortified village of Wytschaete and the far side of the plateau. The divisional boundary of the 36th (Ulster) Division and the 16th (Irish) Division ran through the village and battalions of both divisions overran the remaining defenders and captured the village by 

The German 2nd Division occupied the Wytschaete sector and its infantry was devastated by the seven mine explosions along its part of the front position. The defenders in the village had also suffered severely in heavy artillery and gas bombardments and were not able to resist a British tank and the Irish infantry who overran the village, although at considerable cost to the 16th (Irish) Division. The  commander,  (Lieutenant-General) Maximilian von Laffert was sacked after the battle; writing after the war,  Hermann von Kuhl wrote that had Crown Prince Rupprecht overruled the local commanders on 30 April, the Germans would have avoided one of the "worst tragedies of the war".

Background

Messines ridge

A chain of low hills runs from south-west to north-east around the Belgian city of Ypres in West Flanders, with spurs extending from the east side of the ridge. The ridge has a shallow decline on the east side but an incline of up to  the west side. South of the ridge is the marshy valley of the Douve river, then Ploegsteert (Plugstreet to the British) Wood and Hill 63. The Wulverghem (also Spanbroekmolen) Spur is parallel to the ridge on the west side, the Oosttaverne Spur is to the east and lesser spurs descend towards Gheluvelt, Becelaere and Keiberg. South of Ypres, the land is marked by low ridges and shallow depressions; the ridge blocks access to the district of Heuvelland from Werviq, Comines and Warneton in the Lys valley to the east. In 1917, the two villages on the flat-topped ridge were in ruins but had been fortified for all-round defence. The plateau extended further north, via a sunken road known as Damm Strasse to the White Château on the south side of the Ypres–Comines canal. North of the canal is Hill 60, Observatory Ridge, Stirling Castle and Zonnebeke.

Battle of Messines (1914)

The British 1st Cavalry Division occupied Messines on 14 October 1914. German troops began to attack the ridge during the morning of 21 October and slowly forced back the British left flank. Next day the 2nd Cavalry Division dug in and by 31 October held a line just in front of Messines village. Early in the morning, the Germans attacked and overran the defences on the south-east side of the village but were forced back as dawn broke, as were attackers further north. As mist cleared German artillery bombarded the village and after more attacks the British began slowly to retire to the west side of the village and after a lull the Germans began to fight hand-to hand through the village. During the afternoon, British counter-attacks forced back the German infantry but recaptured few houses. The 2nd Cavalry Division held a  line further north was also attacked on 31 October but no ground was lost. At  on 1 November Messines and Wytschaete were attacked again and German infantry filtered through gaps in the line and attacked from the flanks and from behind and by early in the morning had captured Wytschaete and the ridge between the villages. By now the line further north was held by French troops, with 32nd Division troops in Wytschaete, which was attacked on 2 November from the south by the 6th Bavarian Reserve Division; the French being forced out of the village.

4th Army

The convex eastern slope of Messines Ridge limited artillery observation and beyond the ridge, the Ypres–Comines Canal and the river Lys restricted the space below the ridge where infantry could manoeuvre for counter-attacks. A  withdrawal to the east would uncover the southern slopes of Menin Ridge, the most vital part of  position. By June,  had  guns,  guns and  guns and howitzers on its  front from St Yves to Mt Sorrel.

Prelude

German defences

About  posts per regimental sector were dispersed around the defensive zone. If they had to fall back, the support battalions would advance to restore the front system, except at Spanbroekmolen, which due to its importance was to be held at all costs.

The preliminary bombardment began on 8 May and intensified on 23 May. The breastworks of the front position trenches were demolished and concrete shelters on both sides of the ridge were systematically destroyed. On 26 May, the German front garrisons were ordered to move forward  into shell-holes in no man's land at dawn and return to their shelters at night. When the shelters were destroyed, the shell-hole positions were made permanent, as were those of the support companies further back. The village of Wytschaete was on the summit of the ridge and the main defensive position at the north end of the plateau, having been fortified and prepared for all-round defence. A line of trenches traced the edge of the village and an inner line went round the houses at the village square and the church. The most formidable part of the defences were machine-gun nests in emplacements and house cellars along the western fringe of the village.

Some troops on the ridge were convinced that their positions had been undermined and their morale was depressed further by a prisoner taken on 6 June, who said that the attack would be synchronised with mine explosions. On 1 June, the British bombardment became more intense and nearly every German defensive position on the forward slope was obliterated. British heavy and super-heavy artillery bombardments Wytschaete on 3 June and were followed up by a gas bombardment from the field artillery, which smashed many of the defensive positions in the village. Infantry Regiment 44 lost 57 men killed and 198 wounded from 1 to 6 June, Grenadier Regiment 4 and Fusilier Regiment 33 having about the same number of casualties each. The German air effort reached its maximum from  when German aircraft observed  counter-battery shoots. Wireless interception by the British showed that  German aircraft escorted by up to seven fighters each, were directing the German artillery reply against the Second Army. Long-range fire on Comines, Warneton, Wervicq, smaller villages, road junctions, railways and bridges caused much damage and several ammunition dumps were destroyed.

British preparations

The mine close to Peckham House was opposite the 109th Brigade on the left flank. The 47th Brigade of the 16th (Irish) Division was to advance into the area of the Maedelstede mine and the 49th Brigade past two at Petit Bois. On the left of the 16th (Irish) Division, the 19th (Western) Division was also to advance with the assistance of mines north of Wytschaete.

The Second Army devised a centralised artillery plan of great sophistication, using field survey, gun calibration, weather data and a new and highly accurate  map, to increase the accuracy of British artillery. Methodical target-finding with new sound-ranging equipment, better organisation of flash-spotting and the centralisation of command at a new Army Report Centre, based at Locre Château were introduced. IX Corps arranged four counter-battery groups, each with one heavy artillery group and five bombardment groups, one for each of its three attacking divisions and two (with the heaviest howitzers) in reserve. A Heavy Artillery Group Commander was attached to each divisional artillery headquarters, to command the heavy artillery once the infantry attack began. The IX Corps field artillery groups and sub-groups were formed to have an artillery liaison officer for every infantry brigade, with two sub-groups, one with six  batteries and one with six  batteries.

Surplus field artillery brigade headquarters planned forward moves for the guns and were kept ready to replace casualties. It was expected that much of the artillery would need to switch rapidly from bombardment to engaging German counter-attacks and divisional Forward Observation Officers (FOOs) were to control the artillery which had remained in place. The reserve divisions due to advance to the Oosttaverne Line would control artillery hidden close to the front line and the guns moved forward into no man's land. Each division was given four extra batteries of field artillery, which could be withdrawn from the barrage at the divisional commander's discretion to engage local targets. The field batteries of the three reserve divisions were placed in camouflaged positions, close to the British front line. As each objective was taken by the infantry, the creeping barrage was to pause  ahead and become a standing barrage, while the infantry consolidated. During this time the pace of fire was to slacken to one round per-gun per-minute, allowing the gun-crews a respite, before resuming full intensity as the barrage moved on.

In the week up to 7 June,  and howitzers bombarded the German trenches, cut wire, destroyed strong-points and conducted counter-battery fire against the  guns opposite, using  The intensity of bombardment in the salient began to increase on 8 May, wire cutting began on 21 May and an extra two days were added to the bombardment for more counter-battery fire. The general bombardment intensified again from 23 May, smashing the German breastworks in the first position and the pillboxes on the forward slope. The main bombardment began on 31 May, with only one day of poor weather before the attack and until the infantry advance, more than 3,000,000 shells were fired on a  front. The attack barrage was rehearsed on 3 June to allow British air observers to plot masked German batteries, which mainly remained hidden but many minor flaws in the British barrage were reported. A repeat performance on 5 June induced a larger number of hidden German batteries to open fire and reveal themselves. Wytschaete was subjected to a special super-heavy bombardment and the garrison from Grenadier Regiment 4 reported that the village was smashed by columns of shells dropping onto the village.

Air operations

Two flights of each artillery-observation squadron concentrated on counter-battery observation and one became a bombardment flight, working with particular artillery bombardment groups for wire-cutting and trench-destruction; when the attack began, these flights undertook contact-patrols to observe the positions of British troops. For observation over the rear slopes of the ridge,  were concentrated in II Brigade RFC and eight balloons of II Kite Balloon Wing were placed  behind the British front line.

British fighter aircraft tried to prevent German aircraft observing for their artillery, by dominating the air from the British front line to the German balloon line, about  beyond. No British corps aircraft were shot down by German aircraft until 7 June, when  aircraft were directing artillery fire simultaneously.

Behind the British barrage line was a second line of defence, which used wireless interception to take bearings on German artillery observation aircraft and guide British aircraft into areas where German flights were most frequent. Aeroplane compass stations and an aeroplane intercepting station, were linked by telephone to the army wing headquarters, fighter squadrons, the anti-aircraft commander and the corps heavy artillery headquarters. Areas threatened by German bombardment could be warned, German artillery-observation aircraft could be attacked and German artillery batteries fired on, when they revealed themselves. From , II Brigade had  through wireless interception, shot down one German aircraft, damaged seven and stopped  artillery bombardments.

Normal offensive patrols continued beyond the barrage line out to Ypres to Roulers and Menin, where after German air reinforcements had arrived, large formations of British and German aircraft clashed in long dogfights. Longer-range bombing and reconnaissance flights concentrated on German-occupied airfields and railway stations; the night bombing specialists of 100 Squadron attacked trains around Lille, Courtrai, Roulers and Comines. Two squadrons were reserved for close air support on the battlefield and low attacks on German airfields. There was a thunderstorm in the evening of 6 June but by midnight the sky had cleared and at  British aircraft cruised over the German lines, to camouflage the sound of tanks as they drove to their starting points.

IX Corps preparations

The 2nd Field Survey Company (2nd FSC) set up W Section for sound-ranging in the IX Corps sector, which provided targeting information for the corps counter-battery artillery. Communication was to be by visual means, messenger pigeon, wireless, Fullerphone, runners and SOS rockets. Two cable lines up to the front line were buried by the Royal Engineers Signal Service for the Fullerphones and advanced bases were chosen in the German lines at Spanbroekmolen and Peckham, to be connected by armoured cables across no man's land. When the infantry reached the final objective the advanced stations were to move up to the crest of the ridge. Brigade intelligence sections were to set up observation posts at Spanbroekmolen and Peckham and battalion intelligence sections were to follow their battalions and find places to observe the infantry up to the final objective and send scouts to contact flanking battalions and establish the situation. A divisional signal station was installed on Kemmel Hill in  line of sight with the brigade advanced sections to communicate via Lucas lamp.

Attack training took place on ground marked to show the German defences and officers of flanking battalions attended training sessions to ensure that plans were compatible. A scale model of the ridge was built by the IX Corps Chief Engineer on the Scherpenberg Hill between Locre and La Clytte, with boards around the edges for about a company of men to examine the model together. To assist with communication a message map was devised with the map on one side and a form on the other containing a list of the information needed by the recipient to act on it. Supply dumps for the 36th, 16th and 19th divisions were established at Lindenhoek crossroads, on the Lindenhoek–Neuve Eglise road and beyond these was an advanced dump a brigade dump and one for each of the six attacking battalions. A pack-transport system and  packs for carriers were issued, along with plans to carry up a hot meal to the front line on the midnight before the attack. Oranges, Oxo cubes, chewing-gum and lime juice were issued to each man and every fourth man had a tin of solidified alcohol for cooking.

The 16th (Irish) Division began training for the attack in April, the 49th Brigade rehearsing over a replica of the ground around Wytschaete, during which the junior officers were put under great pressure to perform. The division used the model of Messines Ridge near the Scherpenberg for everyone to become familiar with Wytschaete and the vicinity; the model was adapted to every German alteration to the defences as the British artillery smashed some and the Germans dug others. The division patrolled and raided almost nightly to gather information; a raid on 27 May consisting of  took  killed  troops and lifted many valuable documents and reconnaissance photographs, for  On 4 June,  raided Wytschaete Wood, killed  and captured  From  the 16th (Irish) divisional artillery  18-pounder field gun shells  4.5-inch howitzer rounds beyond the divisional sector from Maedelstaede Farm to the Vierstraat–Wytschaete road. The attack was to be conducted by the 47th Brigade and the 49th Brigade, in which each brigade would attack on a two-battalion front, with two battalions in support, the 48th Brigade and a brigade of the 11th Division being held in reserve.

IX Corps Plan

IX Corps had three intermediate objectives, where fresh infantry would leap-frog through the troops on the objective to continue the advance to the next objective, followed by an advance down the far slope in the afternoon. At  the mines would be detonated and the blue line (first objective) was to be occupied by  followed by a two-hour pause.

Battle

IX Corps

36th (Ulster) Division

Zero hour was  when visibility was expected to be . The usual pattern of night bombardment had continued as a deception but then the mines and the British artillery were fired. Crimson cylinders of flame rose from the mines and pieces of earth landed  distant. Black smoke rose after the flames; there was a flash, the earth shook and then a great roar moved outwards from the detonations. The Spanbroekmolen mine was fifteen seconds late and some soldiers of the 14th Battalion Royal Irish Rifles (RIR) were knocked over, then got up and closed up to the creeping barrage. Keeping direction was difficult while going round the crater edges and platoon commanders used compasses to find the way. Men from the 25th Division on the right strayed into the 36th (Ulster) Division area causing minor congestion but the Germans still alive in the front position were incapable of resistance. Two machine-guns fired on the 109th Brigade front after the British barrage had passed over them; one gun was knocked out by rifle-grenade fire and the other by a Lewis gun.

The German artillery reply was poor and fell on the empty British front line as the British infantry followed the creeping barrage, reaching the red line at   the mopping up battalion collecting prisoners. The barrage stood still for fifteen minutes and the two following companies in each battalion leapfrogged the leading ones, ready to take over the advance to the blue line. As the advance resumed, the right hand battalion of the 107th Brigade descended into the Steenbeek valley on the right; as soon as the barrage had passed, German machine-guns began to fire from L'Enfer Wood, Earl Farm, Skip Point and Scott Farm. Machine-guns at Skip Point fired until the 9th RIR and troops from the 14th RIR rushed them from two directions; the garrison fought on inside until more than  surrendered. At Scott Farm, the commander stood on the blockhouse rallying the garrison until shot down by a sniper, which caused the Germans inside to surrender.

The advance halted again and the troops began to consolidate the ground as the four battalions to attack the black line moved forward in artillery formation, the 107th Brigade battalions encountering a small amount of German artillery-fire in the Steenbeek valley but losing few casualties. At  the barrage began to move forward towards the green intermediate line and as the troops moved beyond it, the garrison of Pick House offered resistance. Rifle-grenades were fired along with a captured machine-gun from the flank and the troops inside surrendered. (The British Vickers gun crews had fallen behind, toiling over the crater-fields with the guns, tripods and ammunition boxes.) The 10th Battalion Royal Inniskilling Fusiliers (RIF) to the north was held up by a machine-gun but a tank nearby was directed towards it and knocked out the gun. The left flank of the Inniskillings was pinned down by German infantry lined along a ditch until a platoon of the 9th Battalion outflanked the position, killed three of the Germans and took the rest prisoner. The 9th Inniskillings and two tanks attacked right-hand side of Wytschaete and the battalion fought its way through the village, taking a battalion headquarters and about fifty prisoners in a house near the Messines–St Eloi road.

The German defence was most successful on the right flank against the 15th RIF, where  before the road between Messines and Wytschaete, German machine-gunners forced the attackers under cover until the positions of the strongpoints were found. A Lewis gun fired at Lumm Farm on the right, while the rest of the platoon attacked and another machine-gun nest on the left was engaged; Lumm Farm was captured by hand-to-hand fighting. Field artillery began to move up to the old front line and some crossed no man's land to the red line, the move being completed just after  but no sign of a substantial German counter-attack was seen for another two hours. Around noon, IX Corps HQ reported that German infantry and transport had been reported moving west from the Ypres–Comines Canal at Houthem by aircraft and balloon observers. The digging in on the black line and strong points further back was well advanced, engineer stores were delivered by pack mule and a big dump of German barbed wire found at Guy Farm was commandeered.

16th (Irish) Division

The attacking troops began their assembly on 6 June, collecting equipment from dumps as they moved to their jumping-off points. From  on 7 June, the British artillery fell silent and then at  the mines began to detonate. As soon as the mines had gone off, the British artillery opened fire, creating three barrage lines and the counter-battery groups bombarded German artillery positions with gas. The infantry began to advance, finding it darker than expected, the visibility being reduced by the smoke and dust of the mines mixing with that of the shell explosions. The 16th (Irish) Division attacked between Maedelstede Farm and the Vierstraat–Wytschaete road and found that the mines at Maedelstede and the two on the left at Petit Bois had devastated the defenders. The mines at Petit Bois in the 49th Brigade area were about  late and knocked over some of the advancing infantry. The garrison of l'Hospice in the northern part of the wood were by-passed and did not surrender until  The second intermediate objective, the first trench of the German second line, on the west side of the plateau, was reached just after  (Captured records showed that the Germans had predicted that an attack could be stopped short of the western crest, until reinforcements from the  divisions arrived.)

A two-hour pause ensued, before the attack on the next objective, the second trench of the German second line at the rear (eastern) crest of the ridge, began and at  the British artillery barrages began to creep forward again. A tank drove into Wytschaete, followed by the 1st Battalion Munster Fusiliers, who advanced into the wreckage of the village from all sides as the 2nd Battalion Royal Irish Regiment captured the northern fringe. The infantry found that the special bombardment on 3 June had demolished the houses and the area was quickly overrun. The Germans in the woods nearby held out for longer, despite the Livens Projector bombardment, managing to get several machine-guns into action. Half of the attacking companies were reserved for mopping up in the village and by  the village had been secured. The supporting battalions leapfrogged through the attacking battalions and several tanks passed through to the eastern side of the village on schedule at  although all the tanks broke down. By  the division had captured  and passed on another  to neighbouring divisions.

Air support

As the infantry moved to the attack contact-patrol aircraft flew low overhead, two being maintained over each corps during the day. The observers were easily able to plot the positions of experienced troops, who lit flares and waved anything to attract attention. Some troops, poorly trained and inexperienced, failed to co-operate, fearing exposure to the Germans so aircraft flew dangerously low to identify them, four being shot down in consequence. Although air observation was not as vital to German operations because of their control of commanding ground, the speed by which reports from air observation could be delivered made it a most valuable form of liaison between the front line and higher commanders. German infantry proved as reluctant to reveal themselves as the British so German flyers also had to make visual identifications. Reports and maps were dropped at divisional headquarters and corps report centres, allowing the progress of the infantry to be followed. During the pause on the ridge crest, an observer reported that the Oosttaverne Line was barely occupied, at  a balloon observer reported a heavy German barrage on the II Anzac Corps front and a counter-attack patrol aircraft reported German infantry advancing either side of Messines. The German counter-attack was "crushed" by artillery fire by 

Each corps squadron kept an aircraft on counter-attack patrol all day, to call for barrage fire if German troops were seen in the open. The speed of the British advance resulted in few German counter-attacks. Artillery observers watched for German gunfire and made  calls but only  to have German guns engaged. The observer used a call sign of the map square letter then the zone letter to signal to the artillery. All guns and howitzers up to  able to bear on the target, opened rapid fire using corrections of aim from the air observer. The observers regulated the bombardment of the Oosttaverne Line and the artillery of VIII Corps to the north of the attack, which was able to enfilade German artillery opposite X Corps.

Fourteen fighters were sent to strafe from low altitude, German ground targets ahead of the British infantry, roving behind German lines, attacking infantry, transport, gun-teams and machine-gun nests; the attacks continued all day, with two of the British aircraft being shot down. Organised attacks were made on the German airfields at Bisseghem and Marcke near Courtrai and the day bombing squadrons attacked airfields at Ramegnies Chin, Coucou, Bisseghem (again) and Rumbeke. Reconnaissance reports of German troops concentrating from Quesnoy–Warneton, led to aircraft setting out to attack them within minutes. German fighters made a considerable effort to intercept corps observation aircraft over the battlefield but were frustrated by patrols on the barrage line and offensive patrols beyond; only one British corps aircraft was shot down by German aircraft during the day. After dark, the night-bombing specialists of 100 Squadron bombed railway stations at Warneton, Menin and Courtrai. Ignorance of the situation at the northern end of the II Anzac Corps front, was resolved by air reconnaissance at dawn on 8 June.

At  on 7 June, the British artillery bombardment ceased; expecting an immediate infantry assault, the German defenders returned to their forward positions. At  mines began to explode, destroying most of the middle breastwork Ib of the front system, killing most of the garrison and paralysing the survivors of the eleven German battalions in the front line, who were swiftly overrun. The 2nd Division, holding the Wytschaete sector received seven of the mine detonations.

The sun was up but the defenders only saw occasional shapes in the dust and smoke as they endured a deluge of artillery fire and strafing by swarms of British aircraft. Laffert expected the two  divisions to reach the  before the British.

On the southern flank, the 1st Guard Reserve Division was to move to the Warneton line east of Messines, then advance around Messines to recapture the original front system. Neither division had been trained for  operations, were new to the area and their advances were plagued by delays; the 7th Division was shelled by British artillery all the way to the Comines canal. The 1st Guard Reserve Division was bombarded as it crossed the Warneton (third) line but reached the area east of Messines by  only to be devastated by the British barrage as it began to creep forward again.

Aftermath

Analysis

Cyril Falls, the 36th (Ulster) Division historian, wrote in 1922 that at conferences and in questionnaires there was some criticism of H-Hour being a few minutes too early and that the creeping barrage had moved too quickly but that the troops had kept up, which contributed to the success of the attack. The mine explosions had guaranteed the capture of the front system up to the red line and had thoroughly demoralised the Germans further back; the tanks had been useful and had prevented some casualties but were not essential to the success of the attack. All regimental officers praised the rear-area services for their prompt arrival on the ridge with supplies, stores and equipment. The infantry judged the new platoon structure introduced in February 1917 with SS 143 Instructions for the Training of Platoons for Offensive Action, to have turned platoons into "...a little self-sufficing force, an army in miniature....", some of which had been led with great tactical skill.

In 1948, the British official historian, James Edmonds wrote that the Battle of Messines was a great victory, which had been achieved with a speed surpassing all other British successes against the Germans; only the capture of Vimy Ridge in April stood comparison. After two years of occupation, the Germans had been ejected from the high ground on the south side of the Ypres Salient; all of the objectives had been captured and  had been taken. The British had suffered few casualties in the attack but the unexpectedly low losses had led to overcrowding on the ridge which was exploited by the Germans close to the ridge to engage with machine-guns and such artillery as was still operational. Edmonds wrote that the victory was not exploited by gaining ground at the west end of the Gheluvelt Plateau, which had been emphasised in earlier plans.

Casualties

Edmonds then wrote that  should be added for wounded likely quickly to return to duty, since they were "omitted" in Der Weltkrieg, a claim that has been severely criticised ever since. In 2007, Sheldon gave  for the German 4th Army from  1917. On 8 June, Grenadier Regiment 8 of the 2nd Division was relieved and only  were left of the troops in the front position; in one day the regiment had suffered  Fusilier Regiment 33 had  and Infantry Regiment 44 lost

Subsequent operations

Oosttaverne Line

A pause of five hours was considered necessary to defeat the German  divisions, before resuming the advance on the Oosttaverne line. The pause was extended by two hours to  after Plumer received reports on the terrible state of the ground. More artillery joined the masked batteries close to the front line and others moved as far into no-man's-land as the terrain allowed. On the nearside of the ridge,  were emplaced to fire an overhead barrage and each division placed sixteen more guns in the observation line on the eastern slope. The  in reserve began to advance at  twelve to join  IX Corps; surviving tanks of the morning attack in X Corps, were to move forward from Damm and Denys woods. On the IX Corps front, the 33rd Brigade (11th Division) had been ordered to advance to Vandamme Farm at  but the message was delayed and the troops did not reach the assembly area at Rommens Farm until  half an hour late. To cover the delay, the corps commander ordered the 57th Brigade (19th (Western) Division) from reserve, to take the Oosttaverne Line from Van Hove Farm to Oosttaverne village, then on to Bug Wood, leaving only the southern  for the 33rd Brigade to take. These orders were also delayed and Major-General Tom Bridges, the 19th (Western) Division commander, asked for a postponement, then ordered the 57th Brigade to advance without waiting for the 33rd Brigade. The troops only knew that they were to attack downhill and keep up to the barrage but were able to occupy the objective in  against light opposition, meeting the Australians at Polka Estaminet.

Notes

Footnotes

References

Books
 
 
 
 
 
 
  converted 
 
 
 
 
 
 
 
 
 
 
 

Theses

Further reading

External links

	
 Wireless for the Warrior: Fullerphone
 Messines Ridge photo essay

1917 in Belgium
1917 in France
Explosions in 1917
Battle of Passchendaele
Battles of the Western Front (World War I)
Battles of World War I involving Germany
Battles of World War I involving the United Kingdom
Conflicts in 1917
Ypres Salient
June 1917 events
Germany–United Kingdom military relations